was a Japanese revolutionary democrat active in the Freedom and People's Rights Movement and one of the founders of the , which was a political party and joined the League for the Establishment of a National Assembly.

Ueki was the son of a middle-ranking samurai from Tosa. Inspired by Itagaki Taisuke, he became involved in the Jiyūtō. Upon release he wrote an article "Freedom is worth purchasing with one's own blood". In 1881 he wrote A Private Draft of the Japanese Constitution, which gave provision for the overthrow of oppressive government.

In 1882 Ueki visited Fukushima in August and September at the invitation of the Fukushima Jiyūtō branch to help set up the local party newspaper Fukushima Jiyū Shimbun, before returning to Tokyo to replace Baba Tatsui on the central party newspaper .

References 

1857 births
1892 deaths
Samurai
People from Kōchi Prefecture
People of Meiji-period Japan
Members of the House of Representatives (Empire of Japan)
Liberal Party (Japan, 1881) politicians